Ossa is a village and a community of the Tempi municipality. Before the 2011 local government reform it was part of the municipality of Nessonas, of which it was a municipal district. The 2011 census recorded 530 inhabitants in the village and 456 inhabitants in the community of Ossa. The community of Ossa covers an area of 13.509 km2.

See also
 List of settlements in the Larissa regional unit

References

Populated places in Larissa (regional unit)